Bulgarian verbs are the most complicated part of Bulgarian grammar, especially when compared with other Slavic languages. Bulgarian verbs are inflected for person, number and sometimes gender. They also have lexical aspect (perfective and imperfective), voice, nine tenses, three moods, four evidentials and six non-finite verbal forms. Because the subject of the verb can be inferred from the verb ending, it is often omitted. As there is no infinitive in the contemporary Bulgarian language the basic form of a verb is its present simple tense first person singular form.

Conjugations
There are three conjugations. The conjugation of a verb  determined by the final vowel of the verb in the third person singular present simple tense. Verbs of the first conjugation end in e, of the second in и and of the third in а or я.

Aspect
Bulgarian verbs express lexical aspect (вид). The verbs are either of imperfective (глаголи от несвършен вид) or perfective (глаголи от свършен вид) aspect. The former describe actions in progress (uncompleted actions) and the latter whole completed actions (actions which have a beginning and an end). So in Bulgarian, an English verb is usually translated by two verbs (or sometimes by even three, see below). Perfective verbs can be usually formed from imperfective ones by suffixation or prefixation, but when prefixes (or very rarely suffixes) are used the resultant verb often deviates in meaning from the original. There are not any strict rules and irregularities are very common. Nevertheless many verbs can be grouped according to their stem change:

{| class="wikitable"
!colspan="1"| Perfective
!colspan="1"| Imperfective
!colspan="1"| Perfective
!colspan="1"| Imperfective
!colspan="1"| Perfective
!colspan="1"| Imperfective
|-
| предложа || предлагам || отговоря || отговарям || кажа || казвам
|-
| изложа || излагам || изговоря || изговарям || накажа || наказвам
|-
| сложа || слагам || преговоря || преговарям || предскажа || предсказвам
|-
| възложа || възлагам || договоря || договарям  || докажа || доказвам
|}

The verbs from one pair are of different conjugations, for example кажа is from the first conjugation and казвам from the third.

In the past imperfect and the present tense perfective verbs cannot stand alone in an independent clause, in these tenses such verbs are used only in subordinate clauses.

Secondary imperfective verbs 
Very often when a perfective verb is formed from an imperfective one by means of a prefix (or rarely a suffix) this verb can be made again imperfective using a suffix. The resultant verb is called secondary imperfective verb (вторичен несвършен глагол). Here are some examples of such verbs:

Verbs from the first type describe uncompleted actions (for example the verb мета could be roughly translated in English as to be sweeping), verbs from the second describe whole, completed actions. Verbs from the third type are a combination between the first two. Although they are imperfective as the initial ones, they preserve the perfective meaning of the second verbs, they are only grammatically imperfective.

An explanation of the nuances between the three columns follows:
 Initial imperfective – мета (meta) – I'm sweeping (continuing action)
 Perfective – ще измета / искам да измета – – I'll sweep up / I want to sweep up  (i.e. I'm announcing that the action will be completed – the perfective form cannot exist in the present indicative as, by definition, it refers to a completed action)
 Secondary imperfective – измитам – (izmitam) – I'm sweeping away completely. (The verbs in this column put the emphasis on the fact that the actions are being carried out in their entirety)

Secondary imperfective verbs are used in cases where it's grammatically incorrect to use perfective verbs (there are tenses, the present tense for example, where perfective verbs cannot stand alone in an independent clause) but one wants to use their meaning, or where the action is complete but repeated over time. See below for examples.

Contrasting imperfective, perfective and secondary imperfective verbs 
Adverbial participle
 imperfective verb: Четейки книгата, срещнах непозната дума = "While I was reading the book, I came across an unknown word" (at one single moment of the action I came across an unknown word)
 perfective verb: no adverbial participle
 secondary imperfective verb: Прочитайки книгата, научих много нови неща. = "By reading the book, I learned a lot of new things" (during the whole action I learned a lot, so after I had read the book I knew a lot of new things)
Present tense
 imperfective verb:
 Чета книга = "I read a book, I'm reading a book" (uncompleted action)
 Когато чета книга, се удремвам = "When I read a book, I become sleepy" (While I'm in the middle of the action; uncompleted action)
 Всеки ден чета книга = "I read a book every day" (but this does not necessarily mean that I read a whole book, just a part of it; uncompleted repetitive action)
 perfective verb: Когато прочета книгата, ще ти я върна = "When I finish reading the book, I will give it back to you" (when I have read the whole book; completed action)
 secondary imperfective verb: Всеки ден прочитам една книга = "I read a whole book every day" (I begin reading and I finish reading a book every day; completed repetitive action)
Past imperfect
 imperfective verb:
 Четях книга = "I was reading a book", "I used to read a book" (but not a whole book; uncompleted action)
 Когато четях книгата, телефонът звънна = "When I was reading the book, the phone rang" (uncompleted action)
 Всеки ден четях книга = "I used to read a book every day" (but not a whole book, uncompleted repetitive action)
 perfective verb: Щом прочетях нова книга, започвах да се хваля всекиму = "Whenever I finished reading a new book, I started boasting about it to everyone" (completed repetitive action, notice that the verb is in a dependent clause)
 secondary imperfective verb: Всеки ден прочитах една книга = "I used to read a whole book every day" (I used to begin and finish reading a book every day; completed repetitive action, notice that the verb is in an independent clause)
Past aorist
 imperfective verb: Вчера четох една книга = "Yesterday, I read a book" (but did not necessarily finish it; uncompleted action)
 perfective verb: Вчера прочетох една книга = "Yesterday, I finished reading a book" (I read a whole book; completed action)
 secondary imperfective verb: identical with the past imperfect
Future tense
 imperfective verb:
 Ще чета книгата = "I will read the book" (but not necessarily the whole book), "I will be reading the book" (uncompleted action)
 Всеки ден ще чета книгата = "I will read the book every day" (but this does not necessarily mean that I will read the whole book, just a part of it; uncompleted repetitive action)
 perfective verb: Ще прочета книгата = "I will read the whole book just once" (I will begin and I will finish reading the book only one time; single completed action)
 secondary imperfective verb: Ще прочитам книгата всеки ден = "I will read the whole book every day" (I will begin and I will finish reading the book every day; completed repetitive action)

Tenses

Present (praesens)
The present tense is used to:
describe an action that is happening at the moment of speaking;
talk about things that are always true;
talk about habits or things that happen on a regular basis;

Imperfective and perfective verbs are conjugated in the same way.

Verbs form the present tense according to their conjugation. They take the following personal endings:

See Bulgarian verb paradigm for the full conjugation.

Discrepancy between spelling and pronunciation 

Although verbs of the first and second conjugation in first person singular end in -а/я, and in third person plural in -ат/ят, when the stress falls on these endings, they are not pronounced а/йа and ат/йат but ъ/йъ and ът/йът instead.

The incorrect pronunciation is considered to be an error.

Neologisms
Newly adopted verbs, especially from English, tend to take a –ирам (–iram) ending, in which case they only have one form (the imperfective). Since this is not a native suffix (loaned from German verbal suffix -ieren), recent colloquial formations prefer the native suffixes –вам (-vam) and –на  (–na) which do form an imperfective/perfective pair. Examples:
 стартирам (startiram – to start), инициирам (initsiiram – to initiate), нокаутирам (nokautiram – to knock out), and even страницирам (stranitsiram – to paginate, with a native stem and the German suffix);
 кликвам/кликна (klikvam/klikna – to click), даунлоудвам/даунлоудна (daunloudvam/daunloudna – to download), шеървам/шеърна (shearvam/shearna – to fileshare).
These verbs, especially the latter group, are extremely new and have not yet made it into the dictionaries.

Past imperfect (imperfectum) 

Past Imperfect (Минало несвършено време) is used to talk about a temporary situation that existed at or around a particular time in the past. It also expresses past actions that were frequent, repeated, permanent or always true. Its most common use is in story telling to provide a background to other actions which are usually expressed with verbs in the past aorist. In this use it means that the action had begun and was in progress when the other  happened, we do not know whether it stopped or not.

Both imperfective and perfective verbs have past imperfect. They are conjugated in the same way.

Verbs form the past imperfect with the following endings (they are the same for all conjugations):

These endings are added to the past imperfect basis. See Bulgarian verb paradigm for the full conjugation.

Past aorist (aoristus)
Past aorist (Минало свършено време) expresses an action that happened at a specific time in the past. Both imperfective and perfective verbs have such tense (there is no difference in their conjugation).

Similarly, as in past imperfect, verbs have past aorist basis to which the following personal endings  are added (they are the same for all conjugations):

See Bulgarian verb paradigm for the full conjugation.

Imperfective and perfective verbs 
Although imperfective and perfective verbs are conjugated in the same way in the past aorist, there is difference in their meaning. Compare the sentences:

Past imperfect or past aorist 
Usually the difference between the two tenses is very clear:
past imperfect is used for habits, things that were always true, actions that happened many times or for background for other actions.
past aorist is used for single actions that have a beginning and an end.
But imperfective verbs both in past imperfect and past aorist can express actions that have long duration and therefore both tenses can be used to say that one action happened at the same time as another. One should always keep in mind that past aorist means that the action began and stopped, and past imperfect that the action was in progress. Compare the sentences (they all contain the imperfective verb играя that expresses an action with some duration, but depending on the tense the sentences have different meaning):

Present perfect (perfectum)
Present perfect (in Bulgarian минало неопределено време, past indefinite tense) expresses an action which happened in the past, but the precise moment when it happened is not specified. It is either not known or not important (in contrast with past aorist). What is important is the result of the action. The tense has a lot in common with the English present perfect.

Present perfect is made up of the verb съм, conjugated in present tense, and the past active aorist participle of the main verb. Not only person (first, second, third) and number, but also gender must be taken into account in the process of conjugating. In other words, the corresponding indefinite forms of the participle (masculine, feminine, neuter, singular, plural) are used according to the gender and number of the subject. For the position of the verb съм see word order.

Example (чета, to read):

In contrast with English, in Bulgarian (very rarely) the present perfect can be used even if the moment when the action happened is specified. In such cases the importance of the action or its result is emphasized:
Снощи до два часа съм гледал телевизия и тази сутрин съм станал в шест, затова съм изключително изтощен. = "Last night, I watched TV until 2 o'clock and this morning, I got up at six, so I'm extremely exhausted."

Past perfect 
Past perfect (in Bulgarian минало предварително време, "past preliminary tense") expresses an action that happened before another past action. It is made up of the past tense of съм and the past active aorist participle of the main verb. Again as in present perfect the participle agrees in number and gender with the subject. For the position of the verb съм see word order.

Example (чета, to read):

Rarely the past perfect can be used for actions that happened at an indefinite time in the past but very long ago, especially in sentences containing the phrase "someone sometimes said":
Някой някога беше казал, че любовта ще спаси света. = "Someone once said that love will save the world."

Future (futurum primum) 

The future tense (in Bulgarian бъдеще време) is formed with the particle ще (derived from the verb ща, "to want") and the present simple tense (ще always stands before the present forms). In contrast with the other tenses negation is not expressed with the particle не, but with the construction няма да + the present tense. Forms with не are also possible but they are found mainly in the poetry.

Example (чета, to read):

The verb съм forms the future in two ways. The first one with its present tense, and the second one with its special future form – бъда.  The latter is more common:

Future perfect (futurum secundum exactum)
Future perfect (in Bulgarian бъдеще предварително време, future preliminary tense) expresses an action which is to take place in the future before another future action. It is made up of the future tense of the verb съм (in this tense the form with бъда is less common than the usual one) and the past active aorist participle of the main verb which agrees in number and gender with the subject.

Example (чета, to read):

Future-in-the-past 
Past future tense or future in the past (in Bulgarian бъдеще време в миналото, future tense in the past) expresses an action which was to be completed in the past but was future as regards another past action. It is made up of the past imperfect of the verb ща "will, want", the particle да "to" and the present tense of the main verb. Negation is expressed with the construction нямаше да + the present tense, although forms with не are also possible but found mainly in the poetry.

Example (чета, to read):

The verb съм forms the future in the past in two ways. The first one with its present tense, and the second one with бъда (щях да съм and щях да бъда). The latter is more common.

Future-in-the-past perfect 
Past future perfect or future perfect in the past (in Bulgarian бъдеще предварително време в миналото, future preliminary tense in the past) expresses a past action which is prior to a past action which itself is future with respect to another past action. It is made up of the past imperfect of ща "will, want", the particle да "to", the present tense of the verb съм "be" (in other words, the past future tense of съм, but not the form with бъда) and the past active aorist participle of the main verb, which agrees in number and gender with the subject.

Example (чета, to read):

Voice
The voice in Bulgarian adjectives is presented not through the auxiliary verb, as it is in English ("I have eaten" – active; "I was eaten" – passive), but rather by the ending on the past participle; the auxiliary remains съм ("to be"):
 Active – ударил съм... – udaril săm... – I have hit...
 Passive – бил съм ударен – bil săm udaren – I have been hit

See also Participles, below.

Mood 
Modal distinctions in subordinate clauses are expressed not through verb endings, but through the choice of complementizer –  че (che) or да (da) (which might both be translated with the relative pronoun "that"). The verbs remain unchanged. Thus:
 Indicative – че –
 e.g. знам, че си тук – znam, che si tuk – I know that you are here;
 Subjunctive – да –
 e.g. настоявам да си тук – nastoyavam da si tuk – I insist that you be here.

The imperative has its own conjugation – usually by adding -и or -ай (-i or -ay) to the root of the verb:
 e.g. sit – сядам → сядай ( – imperfective), or седна → седни (sedna → sedni – perfective).

Conditional mood
The so-called conditional refers to a possible action, which is usually intentional and under the control of a subject. It is formed by a special form of the auxiliary 'съм' (to be), and the aorist active participle of the main verb:

Evidentials

Bulgarian verbs are inflected not only for aspect, tense and modality, but also for evidentiality, that is, the source of the information conveyed by them. There is a four-way distinction between the unmarked (indicative) forms, which imply that the speaker was a witness of the event or knows it as a general fact; the inferential, which signals general non-witness information or one based on inference; the renarrative, which  indicates that the information was reported to the speaker by someone else; and the dubitative, which is used for reported information if the speaker doubts its veracity. This can be illustrated with the four possible ways of rendering in Bulgarian the English sentence 'The dog ate the fish' (here  denotes the aorist active participle):

Indicative:

Inferential:

Renarrative:

Dubitative:

On a theoretical level, there are alternatives to treating those forms as the four members of a single evidential category. Kutsarov, for example, posits a separate category, which he terms 'type of utterance' (вид на изказването), proper to which is only the distinction  between forms expressing speaker's own statements (indicative, inferential), and forms  that retell statements of another (renarrative, dubitative). The inferential is then viewed as one of the moods, and the dubitative – as a renarrative inferential, whose dubitative meaning, albeit more frequent, is only secondary. Another view is presented by Gerdzhikov – in his treatment there are two distinctive features involved – subjectivity and renarrativity. The indicative is unmarked for both, while the inferential is marked for subjectivity, the renarrative for renarrativity, and the dubitative for both subjectivity and renarrativity.

Forms
An evidential for a given tense is formed by taking the past active participle of the verb (or auxiliary, if there is one) of the corresponding indicative tense, and adding a form of the auxiliary verb съм (to be). For the inferential and the renarrative it is its present tense form, which, however, is omitted in the 3rd person of the renarrative; hence inferential and renarrative forms are generally not distinguished in the 1st and 2nd person. The dubitative is formed from the renarrative by adding the past active participle of the verb съм (to be). An example paradigm is given in the following table. Given for reference are some tenses of the indicative (these are the imperfect, aorist, perfect, future in the past and future perfect in the past). Whenever there are participles involved, they are given in their masculine form, but they have different forms for the three genders in the singular.

Additionally, there are also a few rare forms for some of the future tenses. In some cases, there are less common forms in which the auxiliary ще remains impersonal instead of being inflected for person and number; thus for the inferential and renarrative future/future in the past rare forms of the type ще съм четя̀л are possible alongside the more common forms of the type щя̀л съм да чета̀, for the inferential future perfect in the past – ще съм бѝл чѐл alongside the usual щя̀л съм да съм чѐл, and for the dubitative future/ future in the past – rare forms of the type ще съм бѝл четя̀л in addition to the more common forms of the type щя̀л съм бѝл да чета̀. Also, the negative form of the dubitative future perfect/future perfect in the past can be either ня̀мало било̀ да съм чѐл, or ня̀мало съм бил да съм чѐл.

Inferential

Present and Imperfect Inferential 
Present Inferential is not used.

Aorist Inferential

Present Perfect and Past Perfect Inferential 
Present Perfect Inferential is not used.

Future and Future-in-the-past Inferential 
Future Inferential is not used.

Future Perfect and Future-in-the-past Perfect Inferential 
Future Perfect Inferential is not used.

Renarrative

Present and Imperfect Renarrative

Aorist Renarrative

Present Perfect and Past Perfect Renarrative

Future and Future-in-the-past Renarrative

Future Perfect and Future-in-the-past Perfect Renarrative

Dubitative

Present and Imperfect Dubitative

Aorist, Present Perfect and Past Perfect Dubitative 
Notice that Present Perfect and Past Perfect Dubitative have the same forms as Aorist Dubitative.

Future and Future-in-the-past Dubitative

Future Perfect and Future-in-the-past Perfect Dubitative

Non-finite verb forms

Participles

Present active participle

Past active participle 
Past active aorist participle (минало свършено деятелно причастие) is used to form the present perfect, in the renarrative and conditional mood and as an adjective. It is formed by adding -л (this is its masculine indefinite form) to the past aorist basis (first person singular past aorist tensе but without the final х), but additional alterations of the basis are also possible. The indefinite feminine, neuter and plural forms take respectively the endings -а, -о and -и after the masculine form. The definite forms are formed from the indefinite by adding the definite articles -ят/я for masculine participles, та for feminine participles, то for neuter participles and те for plural participles
 See also Voice above
See Bulgarian verb paradigm for the full conjugation.

Past active renarrative participle 
Can be used only predicatively

Past passive participle

Gerund (present active adverbial participle)

Action nouns

Action nouns ending in -не 
Can be formed only from imperfective verbs

Action nouns ending in -ние 
Can be formed from both imperfective and perfective verbs

Obsolete verb forms

Present passive participle 
Obsolete; used only as adjective in modern Bulgarian

Infinitive 
Obsolete

Notes

References

Bibliography

External links

Verbs
Indo-European verbs